Come Together is the fifth studio album by Christian rock band Third Day. The title track is commonly used as a tribute to 9/11. The album won the Grammy Award for Best Rock Gospel Album in 2003 beating Petra's Jekyll & Hyde.

Track listing 

All songs written by Mac Powell except where noted; music by Third Day.
 "Come Together" – 4:31
 "40 Days" – 3:11
 "Show Me Your Glory" (Marc Byrd, Mark Lee) – 3:19
 "Get On" – 2:57
 "My Heart" (Brad Avery) – 3:40
 "It's Alright" – 5:08
 "Still Listening" – 4:08
 "I Got You" – 4:18
 "I Don't Know" – 4:53
 "When The Rain Comes" (Lee) – 2:55
 "Sing Praises" – 3:19
 "Nothing Compares" – 3:49

Personnel 
Third Day
 Mac Powell – acoustic guitar, lead and backing vocals
 Brad Avery – guitars
 Mark Lee – guitars
 Tai Anderson – bass
 David Carr – drums, percussion

Additional musicians

 Monroe Jones – keyboards, programming
 Jeff Roach – keyboards
 Scotty Wilbanks – keyboards
 Blaine Barcus – percussion
 Ken Lewis – percussion
 Sam Levine – saxophone
 Barry Green – trombone
 Mike Haynes – trumpet
 David Angell – strings
 Monisa Angell – strings
 John Catchings – strings
 David Davidson – strings
 Geof Barkley – backing vocals
 Tabitha Fair – backing vocals

Production

 Monroe Jones – producer
 Robert Beeson – executive producer
 Dan Raines – executive producer
 Bob Wohler – executive producer
 Jim Dineen – engineer, mixing at The Castle, Franklin, Tennessee (9, 11)
 Karl Egsieker – assistant engineer
 Ryan Williams – assistant engineer (1, 2, 4, 5, 8, 12)
 Benjamin Price – assistant engineer (3, 6, 7, 10)
 Steve Short – assistant engineer (9, 11)
 Nick Didia – mixing at Southern Tracks, Atlanta, Georgia (1, 2, 4, 5, 8, 12)
 Shane Wilson – mixing at Southern Living at Its Finest, Atlanta, Georgia (3, 6, 7, 10)
 Fred Paragano – editing at Paragon Audio Productions. Franklin, Tennessee
 George Cocchini – studio technician
 Bob Dennis – studio technician
 Jeremy Ramsey – studio technician
 Stephen Marcussen – mastering at Marcussen Mastering, Hollywood, California
 Michelle Pearson – production coordination
 Jamie Kiner – production manager
 Terria Butler – art direction
 Jordyn Thomas – art direction
 Third Day – art direction
 Tim Parker – design
 David Dobson – photography
 Kristin Barlowe – stylist
 John Murphy – stylist
 Traci Fleming Smith – hair and make–up

Charts

Weekly charts

Year-end charts

References

Third Day albums
2001 albums
Essential Records (Christian) albums
Grammy Award for Best Rock Gospel Album